The University of Delhi (UOD), informally known as Delhi University (DU), is a collegiate public central university, located in New Delhi, India. It was founded in 1922 by an Act of the Central Legislative Assembly. As a collegiate university, its main functions are divided between the academic departments of the university and affiliated colleges. Consisting of three colleges, two faculties, and 750 students at its founding, the University of Delhi has since become India's largest institution of higher learning and among the largest in the world. The university currently consists of 16 faculties and 86 departments distributed across its North and South campuses and an enrollment of over 162,000 regular students and 261,000 non-formal students. The Vice-President of India serves as the university's chancellor.

The University of Delhi is composed of 77 affiliated colleges and 5 other recognized institutes.

Colleges

Institutes
 Ahilya Bai College of Nursing
 Amar Jyoti Institute of Physiotherapy
 Chacha Nehru Bal Chikitsalaya
 College of Nursing at Army Hospital (R & R)
 Durgabai Deshmukh College of Special Education
 Holy Family College of Nursing
 Pt. Deendayal Upadhyaya Institute of Physically Handicapped
 School of Rehabilitation Sciences

References 

Affiliates
Delhi University
Delhi